Paul Younane (born 8 February 1960) is an Australian former rugby league footballer for the Parramatta Eels and the Penrith Panthers in the New South Wales Rugby League premiership competition. He also played for Warrington in the Rugby Football League.

Rugby Player

Point scoring summary

Matches played

References

1960 births
Living people
Australian rugby league players
Parramatta Eels players
Penrith Panthers players
Rugby league centres
Place of birth missing (living people)
Warrington Wolves players